Henry Melville Youmans (May 15, 1832 – July 8, 1920) was a politician from the U.S. state of Michigan.

Youmans was born in Otego, New York, and attended the common schools.  He was in the employ of the York & Erie Railroad Co. on the Susquehanna division for ten years.  He moved to East Saginaw, Michigan, in 1862 and engaged in the manufacture of lumber and salt from 1863 to 1878.  He moved to St. Clair County in 1878 and engaged in farming and lumbering until 1884 when he returned to East Saginaw.   Youmans served as mayor of East Saginaw in 1886 and 1887, and also served four terms as alderman.

In the general election of 1890, Youmans ran as the candidate of the Democratic Party and defeated incumbent Republican Aaron T. Bliss to be elected from Michigan's 8th congressional district to the 52nd United States Congress, serving from March 4, 1891, to March 3, 1893. He was chairman of the Committee on Expenditures on Public Buildings.  He was an unsuccessful candidate for reelection in 1892, losing to Republican William S. Linton.  He was also unsuccessful against Joseph W. Fordney in 1902.

After leaving Congress, Henry M. Youmans became a member of the Michigan Senate (22nd district) in 1896 and 1897.  He engaged in agricultural pursuits in Bridgeport, Michigan, until his death in Saginaw, where he was interred in Brady Hill Cemetery.

References

Henry M. Youmans at The Political Graveyard

External links

1832 births
1920 deaths
People from Otsego County, New York
Michigan city council members
Mayors of Saginaw, Michigan
Democratic Party Michigan state senators
Democratic Party members of the United States House of Representatives from Michigan
People from Bridgeport, Michigan